For Italian football transfers summer 2010 see the following articles:

List of Italian football transfers summer 2010 (July)
List of Italian football transfers summer 2010 (August)
List of Italian football transfers summer 2010 (co-ownership)
Tran
2010
Italy